Roundtop Mountain is a mountain located in the Catskill Mountains of New York north-northwest of Wittenberg. Beetree Hill is located east-northeast, Johns Mountain is located east-northeast, and Mount Tobias is located north-northwest of Roundtop Mountain.

References

Mountains of Ulster County, New York
Mountains of New York (state)